Littlecote may refer to several places in England:

Littlecote, Buckinghamshire, a hamlet
Littlecote House, Wiltshire
Littlecote Roman Villa, Wiltshire